The 1896 Rikuu earthquake is an inland earthquake that occurred on August 31, 1896, near the border between Akita and Iwate prefectures, Japan. Magnitude was 7.2. The earthquake left 209 people dead (205 people dead in Akita Prefecture) and 779 people injured. Senya Fault is a fault which was responsible for 1896 Rikuu earthquake, along with surface rupture.

See also 
 Senya Fault

References

External links 
 1896年陸羽地震 - Iwate Prefecture
 陸羽地震 (1896年8月31日 M7.2) - Headquarters for Earthquake Research Promotion

1896 earthquakes
Earthquakes of the Meiji period
1896 in Japan
August 1896 events
1896 disasters in Japan